Jordi van Stappershoef (born 10 March 1996) is a Dutch footballer who plays as a goalkeeper for AFC. Besides the Netherlands, he has played in England.

Club career
He made his professional debut in the Eerste Divisie for FC Volendam on 29 August 2014 in a game against Sparta Rotterdam.

Bristol Rovers
On 13 June 2019, van Stappershoef joined League One side Bristol Rovers on a free transfer. He made his debut for the club in the EFL Trophy in a 1–1 draw with Plymouth Argyle, and made his first league start that weekend on the 7 September 2019 in a 3–3 draw with Accrington Stanley due to the fact first-choice ‘keeper Anssi Jaakkola was on international duty. At the end of the 2020–21 season, van Stappershoef was announced to be one of thirteen players who would not be having their contract extended at the club.

Return to the Netherlands
Following his release from Bristol Rovers, van Stappershoef returned to the Netherlands to join Jong AZ. He subsequently joined AFC in November 2021.

Career statistics

References

External links
 

1996 births
Footballers from Amsterdam
Living people
Dutch footballers
Association football goalkeepers
FC Volendam players
Bristol Rovers F.C. players
Jong AZ players
Amsterdamsche FC players
Eerste Divisie players
Derde Divisie players
Tweede Divisie players
English Football League players
Dutch expatriate footballers
Expatriate footballers in England
Dutch expatriate sportspeople in England